The Jeolla Line is a railway line in North and South Jeolla Provinces in South Korea. The line is served by frequent passenger trains from Seoul (via the Gyeongbu and Honam Lines) to Yeosu.

History

The first railway along a section of what became the Jeolla Line was the Zenboku Lightrail Line, a  narrow gauge line from Riri to Zenshu opened by the privately owned Zenboku Light Railway on 12 November 1917.  In 1927, the line was nationalised, and the Chosen Government Railway (Sentetsu) soon set to converting the line to standard gauge; this work was begun on 18 April 1929 and completed later that year. Sentetsu then extended the line, completing the Jeonju–Namwon section in October 1931, the Namwon–Gokseong section in October 1933, and finally the Gokseong–Suncheon section on 16 December 1936.

In 1936, Sentetsu nationalised the privately owned Chosen Railway's Gwangnyeo Line, which ran from Songjeongni to Yeosu and Yeosu Port via Suncheon, renaming it Songnyeo Line and splitting it apart to merge the Suncheon–Yeosu section with the Jeonbuk Line to creat the Jeolla Line in 1936. The line was completed with the reconstruction of the Iri (today Iksan) to Jeonju section in March 1937.

Upgrade

The upgrade of the Iksan-Suncheon section started with the construction of a bypass around Jeonju with wider curves, opened in 1981.

From 1989, the first phase of the project to re-lay and double-track the line, mostly in a new alignment with wider curves, longer tunnels and bridges, was launched on three sections between Sin-ri, at the end of the Jeonju realignment, and Suncheon.

By March 2010, progress on the  section from Iksan to Suncheon reached 63.0%. This phase of the project is implemented as a public private partnership of the Build-Transfer-Lease (BTL) method, with a government contribution of 510.852 billion won and a BTL share of 470.699 billion won. The upgrade and re-alignment of the final Suncheon-Yeosu section was launched as a separate project in 2001, with work starting in December 2003. The entire upgrading project is to be completed in 2011.

On September 1, 2010, the South Korean government announced a strategic plan to reduce travel times from Seoul to 95% of the country to under 2 hours by 2020.

Major stations

Major stations and junctions on the line:

Iksan (formerly known as Iri), junction with the Honam Line and Janghang Line;
Dongsan, terminus of the Bukjeonju Line;
Jeonju, capital of North Jeolla;
Suncheon, junction with the Gyeongjeon Line;
Deogyang, terminus of the Yeocheon Line; and
Yeosu on the south coast.

Services

The Jeolla Line is served by intercity ITX-Saemaeul trains and cross-country Mugunghwa-ho trains. As of October 2010, the travel time on the Saemaeul-ho from Yongsan station in Seoul is a minimum 3 hours 28 minutes to Jeonju, 4 hours 33 minutes to Suncheon and 5 hours 15 minutes to Yeosu, with 2 hours 30 minutes taken for the Iksan—Jeosu travel along the Jeolla Line itself . Mugunghwa-ho trains that also start in Yongsan cover the line from Iksan to Yeosu in between a minimum of 2 hours 30 minutes and a maximum of 4 hours, depending on the number of stops.

Jeolla KTX

Yeosu hosted the Expo 2012, and Korail timed the introduction of Korea Train Express services on the line ahead of the event. Original plans foresaw the start of Jeolla KTX services in April 2011, reducing the Seoul–Yeosu travel time to 2 hours 55 minutes, using KTX-II (KTX-Sancheon) high-speed trains.  In February 2011, when the necessary electrification works were 96% complete, the start of services was postponed to September 2011, and the Yongsan–Yeosu travel time was planned to be 3 hours 7 minutes.  After the completion of the first stage of the Honam High Speed Railway, the travel time is planned to reduce to 2 hours 25 minutes.

See also
Korail
Transportation in South Korea

References

External links 
 

Railway lines in South Korea
Railway lines opened in 1914